The 2010–11 Segunda División B season is the 34th since its establishment. The first matches of the season were played on 28 August 2010, and the season ended on 26 June 2011 with the promotion play-off finals.

Group 1
Teams from Canary Islands, Castile-La Mancha, Community of Madrid, Extremadura and Galicia.

Summary before 2010–11 season 
Scores and Classification - Group 1
Playoffs de Ascenso:
 SD Ponferradina - Promoted to Segunda División
 SD Eibar - Eliminated in Second Round
 CF Palencia - Eliminated in First Round
 Pontevedra CF - Eliminated in Second Round

Promoted to This Group From Tercera División:
 Badajoz - Founded in: 1905//, Based in: Badajoz, Extremadura//, Promoted From: Group 14
 Coruxo - Founded in: 1930//, Based in: Vigo, Galicia//, Promoted From: Group 1
 Deportivo B - Founded in: 1964//, Based in: A Coruña, Galicia//, Promoted From: Group 1
 Extremadura - Founded in: 2007//, Based in: Almendralejo, Extremadura//, Promoted From: Group 14
 Getafe B - Founded in: 1983//, Based in: Getafe, Community of Madrid//, Promoted From: Group 7
 Rayo B - Founded in: 1956//, Based in: Madrid, Community of Madrid//, Promoted From: Group 7

Relegated to This Group From Segunda División:
 None

Relegated to Tercera División:
Sestao River - Founded in: 1996//, Based in: Sestao, Basque Country//, Relegated to: Group 4
Izarra - Founded in: 1924//, Based in: Estella-Lizarra, Navarre//, Relegated to: Group 15
Racing de Ferrol - Founded in: 1919//, Based in: Ferrol, Galicia//, Relegated to: Group 1
Compostela - Founded in: 1962//, Based in: Santiago de Compostela, Galicia//, Relegated to: Group 1

Stadia and locations

League table

Results

Top goalscorers
Last updated 15 May 2011

Top goalkeepers
Last updated 15 May 2011

Group 2
Teams from Asturias, Aragon, Basque Country, Cantabria, Castile and León, La Rioja and Navarre.

Summary before 2010–11 season 
Scores and Classification - Group 2
Playoffs de Ascenso:
 AD Alcorcón - Promoted to Segunda División
 Real Oviedo - Eliminated in First Round
 CD Guadalajara - Eliminated in First Round
 Universidad LPGC - Eliminated in Second Round

Promoted to This Group From Tercera División:
 Caudal - Founded in: 1918//, Based in: Mieres, Asturias//, Promoted From: Group 2
 La Muela - Founded in: 2004//, Based in: La Muela, Aragon//, Promoted From: Group 17
 Peña Sport - Founded in: 1925//, Based in: Tafalla, Navarre//, Promoted From: Group 15
 Real Sociedad B - Founded in: 1951//, Based in: San Sebastián, Basque Country//, Promoted From: Group 4

Relegated to This Group From Segunda División:
 Real Unión - Founded in: 1915//, Based in: Irún, Basque Country//Relegated From: Segunda División

Relegated to Tercera División:
Toledo - Founded in: 1928//, Based in: Toledo, Castile-La Mancha//, Relegated to: Group 18
Racing Santander B - Founded in: 1926//, Based in: Santander, Cantabria//, Relegated to: Group 3
Villanovense - Founded in: 1992//, Based in: Villanueva de la Serena, Extremadura//, Relegated to: Group 14
Tenerife B - Founded in: 1967//, Based in: Santa Cruz de Tenerife, Canary Islands//, Relegated to: Group 12
Lanzarote - Founded in: 1970//, Based in: Lanzarote, Canary Islands//, Relegated to: Group 12

Stadia and locations

League table

Results

Top goalscorers
Last updated 15 May 2011

Top goalkeepers
Last updated 15 May 2011

Group 3
Teams from Aragon, Balearic Islands, Catalonia and Valencian Community.

Summary before 2010–11 season 
Scores and Classification - Group 3
Playoffs de Ascenso:
 UE Sant Andreu - Eliminated in Third Round
 FC Barcelona Atlètic - Promoted to Segunda División
 Ontinyent CF - Eliminated in Third Round
 CD Alcoyano - Eliminated in First Round

Promoted to This Group From Tercera División:
 Alzira - Founded in: 1946//, Based in: Alzira, Valencian Community//, Promoted From: Group 6
 Atlético Baleares - Founded in: 1920//, Based in: Palma de Mallorca, Balearic Islands//, Promoted From: Group 11
 Gandía - Founded in: 1947//, Based in: Gandía, Valencian Community//, Promoted From: Group 6
 L'Hospitalet - Founded in: 1957//, Based in: L'Hospitalet de Llobregat, Catalonia//, Promoted From: Group 5
 Santboià - Founded in: 1908//, Based in: Sant Boi de Llobregat, Catalonia//, Promoted From: Group 5
 Teruel - Founded in: 1946//, Based in: Teruel, Aragon//, Promoted From: Group 17

Relegated to This Group From Segunda División:
 Castellón - Founded in: 1922//, Based in: Castellón de la Plana, Valencian Community//, Relegated From: Segunda División

Relegated to Tercera División:
Espanyol B - Founded in: 1981//, Based in: Barcelona, Catalonia//, Relegated to: Group 5
Villajoyosa - Founded in: 1944//, Based in: Villajoyosa, Valencian Community//, Relegated to: Group 6
Valencia Mestalla - Founded in: 1944//, Based in: Valencia, Valencian Community//, Relegated to: Group 6
Gavà - Founded in: 1922//, Based in: Gavà, Catalonia//, Relegated to: Group 5
Terrassa - Founded in: 1906//, Based in: Terrassa, Catalonia//, Relegated to: Group 5

Stadia and locations

League table

Results

Top goalscorers
Last updated 15 May 2011

Top goalkeepers
Last updated 15 May 2011

Group 4
Teams from Andalusia, Castile-La Mancha, Ceuta, Melilla and Region of Murcia.

Summary before 2010–11 season 
Scores and Classification - Group 4
Playoffs de Ascenso:
 Granada CF - Promoted to Segunda División
 UD Melilla - Eliminated in First Round
 Real Jaén - Eliminated in Second Round
 Polideportivo Ejido - Eliminated in First Round

Promoted to This Group From Tercera División:
 Alcalá - Founded in: 1944//, Based in: Alcalá de Guadaira, Andalusia, Promoted From: Group 10
 Yecla - Founded in: 2004//, Based in: Yecla, Region of Murcia, Promoted From: Group 13
 Jumilla - Founded in: 1975//, Based in: Jumilla, Region of Murcia//, Promoted From: Group 13
 Almería B - Founded in: 2001//, Based in: Almería, Andalusia, Promoted From: Group 9

Relegated to This Group From Segunda División:
 Cádiz - Founded in: 1910//, Based in: Cádiz, Andalusia//, Relegated From: Segunda División
 Real Murcia - Founded in: 1908//, Based in: Murcia, Region of Murcia//, Relegated From: Segunda División

Relegated to Tercera División:
Moratalla - Founded in: 1979//, Based in: Moratalla, Region of Murcia//, Relegated to: Group 13
Jerez Industrial - Founded in: 1950//, Based in: Jerez de la Frontera, Andalusia//, Relegated to: Group 10
Marbella - Founded in: 1997//, Based in: Marbella, Andalusia//, Relegated to: Group 9
Águilas - Founded in: 1925//, Based in: Águilas, Region of Murcia//, Relegated to: Group 13

Stadia and locations

League table

Results

Top goalscorers
Last updated 15 May 2011

Top goalkeepers
Last updated 15 May 2011 

 
2010-11
3
Spain